Statistics of 2001–02 National Football Championship (Bangladesh).

Overview
Mohammedan SC won the championship.

References
 RSSSF

 
1
1